Harris Blitzer Sports & Entertainment (HBSE) is an American sports and entertainment holding company based in Camden, New Jersey. It was founded in 2017 by Josh Harris and David S. Blitzer to consolidate their shared ventures. HBSE owns and operates the Philadelphia 76ers of the National Basketball Association, the New Jersey Devils of the National Hockey League, the Delaware Blue Coats of the NBA G League, the Utica Comets of the American Hockey League, and the esports organization Dignitas, among other properties.

History
Harris Blitzer Sports & Entertainment was founded in 2017 by American investors Josh Harris and David S. Blitzer to consolidate their existing ventures and any future endeavors. In 2018, HBSE partnered with the San Francisco 49ers and Creative Artists Agency (CAA) to create Elevate Sports Venture, a sports and entertainment company focused on marketing, hospitality, and event ticketing. In 2019, HBSE formed an esports entertainment company, New Meta Entertainment, after merging esports business Dignitas with Clutch Gaming and raising $30 million in funding. 

In 2020, the company pledged $20 million to fight racial injustice in black communities. The same year, the organization hired its first Chief Diversity and Impact Officer. In response to the COVID-19 pandemic, Harris and Blitzer donated millions of dollars to local communities around Philadelphia and Newark focused on families, health care, and education. The company also provided food cards to city residents, donated supplies to health workers and Chromebooks for students and teachers.

Brands
 Philadelphia 76ers, National Basketball Association team
 Sixers Innovation Lab, sports startup accelerator
 76ers Gaming Club, NBA 2K League team
 New Jersey Devils, National Hockey League team
 Prudential Center in Newark
 Delaware Blue Coats, NBA G League team
 Utica Comets, American Hockey League team
 Dignitas, esports organization
 HBSE Ventures, sports technology venture capital firm
 Elevate Sports Ventures, marketing and event ticketing partnership

References

External links

Companies based in Camden, New Jersey
Sports management companies
Philadelphia 76ers
New Jersey Devils
2017 establishments in New Jersey
Sports holding companies of the United States
Entertainment companies established in 2017
American companies established in 2017